Christiandy Sanjaya (Hanzi: 黃漢山, Hanyu Pinyin: Huáng Hànshān, Hakka: Bong Hon Sham, born 29 March 1964) is an Indonesian politician who was the Deputy Governor of West Kalimantan between 2008 and 2018. He was elected to the post together with his running mate, incumbent Governor Cornelis, after winning the 2007 West Kalimantan gubernatorial election. They were re-elected for the second term on the 2012 West Kalimantan gubernatorial election.

Family and personal life 
His father is B. Kurniadi (Bong Kui Hin) and his mother is C. Tjukriati (Djong Tjuk Tjhin). He married Karyanti Tjung and they have one son whose name is Arkan Dhanu, a journalist for NET. Television. He and his wife regularly attend the Pontianak Congregation of West Kalimantan Christian Church.

Career 
Before elected as deputy governor, he was the principal of Immanuel Christian Vocational School.

References 

1964 births
Living people
People from Singkawang
Indonesian politicians of Chinese descent
Indonesian Protestants
Heads of schools in Indonesia
Politicians from West Kalimantan